The 2016–17 season was Cardiff City's 118th season in their existence and the 89th in the Football League. Along with competing in the Championship, the club also participated in the FA Cup and League Cup. It was Paul Trollope's first season in charge since replacing Russell Slade as head coach. Trollope was sacked on 5 October, whilst Cardiff were in the relegation zone, their lowest position in 11 years, and was replaced with Neil Warnock. The season covers the period from 1 July 2016 to 30 June 2017.

Kit

|
|

First-Team squad

 Appearances and goals for the club are up to date as of 7 May 2017

Statistics

|-
|colspan=14|First team players out on loan:

|-
|colspan=14|First team player(s) that left the club:

|}

Goals record

Disciplinary record

Contracts

Transfers

In

Expenditure  – Undisclosed (£3,700,000+)

Loans in

Out

Income  – Undisclosed (£5,000,000+)

Loans out

Pre-season

Competitions

EFL Championship

League table

Results summary

Results by matchday

Matches

FA Cup

EFL Cup

Summary

Club staff

Backroom staff

Board of directors

References

Cardiff City F.C. seasons
Cardiff City
Cardiff